Road to UFC is an American reality television series and Ultimate Fighting Championship (UFC) mixed martial arts (MMA) competition. 
The show was slightly different from The Ultimate Fighter show in that participants do not share a house but trained in their hometowns. The inaugural event “Road to UFC: Japan” took place back in 2015 to crown a contender at the featherweight division.

List of Seasons

List of Contract Winners

References

Mixed martial arts events